Rajarhat is a locality in Bidhannagar Municipal Corporation of North 24 Parganas district in the Indian state of West Bengal. It is close to Kolkata, specifically North Kolkata, and also a part of the area covered by Kolkata Metropolitan Development Authority (KMDA). Lying just on the periphery of the planned New Town, Rajarhat-Gopalpur has seen huge spurt in real estate development.

Demographics
As per the 2011 census, Rajarhat-Gopalpur Municipality had a total population of 402,844 persons, Males constitute 50.55% of the population and females 49%. Rajarhat-Gopalpur has an average literacy rate of 89.69%.

Administration

The bidhannagar municipal corporation consists of 41 wards. It consisted of many localities such as: Kestopur, Chandiberia, Rabindra Pally, Samar Pally, Baguiati, Udayan Pally, Santosh Pally, Jagatpur, Ashwini Nagar, Narayantala, Raghunathpur, Arjunpur, Teghoria, Jyangra, Helabottala, Noapara, Adarsha Pally, Pramodgarh, Jyoti Nagar, Hatiara, Kaikhali, Chinar Park, Atghara, Dasadrone, Salua, Bablatala, Narayanpur, Beraberi, Bidisha Pally, Sarada Pally, Ganti and part of NSCBI Airport. On 18 June 2015, Bidhannagar Municipal Corporation (BMC) was constituted by merging the existing municipal areas of Rajarhat-Gopalpur Municipality, Bidhannagar Municipality and the panchayat area of Mahishbathan II Gram Panchayat. Now Rajarhat-Gopalpur has 26 wards (ward no. 1 to 26) under Bidhannagar Municipal Corporation.

The area is under the jurisdiction of the Bidhannagar Police Commissionerate.

See also
 Rajarhat Gopalpur (Vidhan Sabha constituency)
 Rajarhat New Town (Vidhan Sabha constituency)
 New Town, Kolkata
 Rajarhat (community development block)

External links

References

Cities and towns in North 24 Parganas district
Neighbourhoods in North 24 Parganas district
Neighbourhoods in Kolkata
Kolkata Metropolitan Area